Volleyball, for the 2015 Island Games, took place indoors at the Queen's Hall which is located at Fort Regent, and outside at Weighbridge Place in Saint Helier.

Medal table

Events

References

2015 Island Games
2015 in volleyball
2015